Garcinia thwaitesii is a species of flowering plant in the family Clusiaceae. It is found only in Sri Lanka.

References

thwaitesii
Endemic flora of Sri Lanka
Endangered plants
Taxonomy articles created by Polbot